The 2012 Spanish motorcycle Grand Prix was the second round of the 2012 Grand Prix motorcycle racing season. It took place on the weekend of 27–29 April 2012 at the Circuito de Jerez, located in Jerez de la Frontera, Spain. Casey Stoner won the MotoGP race, while Pol Espargaró and Romano Fenati won the Moto2 and Moto3 races respectively.

Classification

MotoGP

Moto2
The race was red-flagged after 17 laps due to rain.

Moto3

Championship standings after the race (MotoGP)
Below are the standings for the top five riders and constructors after round two has concluded.

Riders' Championship standings

Constructors' Championship standings

 Note: Only the top five positions are included for both sets of standings.

References

Spanish motorcycle Grand Prix
Spanish
motorcycle
Portuguese motorcycle Grand Prix